Michael Thomas Mann (April 21, 1919 – January 1, 1977) was a German-born musician and professor of German literature.

Life
Born in Munich, Michael Mann was the youngest child of writer Thomas Mann and Katia Mann. He studied viola and violin in Zürich, Paris and New York City. On March 6, 1939, he married the Swiss-born Gret Moser (1916–2007) in New York. With her he had two sons, Fridolin ("Frido") and Anthony ("Toni"), as well as an adopted daughter, Raju.

Between 1942 and 1947 he was a violinist in the San Francisco Symphony Orchestra. In 1949 he made appearances as a viola soloist in the United States and Europe. Accompanied by pianist Yaltah Menuhin, he made a concert tour in 1951 and recorded the 1948 Viola Sonata by Ernst Krenek. He was forced to give up professional music due to a neuropathy.

Mann then studied German literature at Harvard, and later worked as a professor at the University of California, Berkeley.

Michael, like several of his siblings and at least two of his aunts, suffered from depression and died of a combined consumption of alcohol and barbiturates in Orinda, California; it is considered likely that he committed suicide. There is a stone with his name on it on his parents' grave in Kilchberg, Switzerland.

Discography
Deutsche Grammophon. Recorded in Hanover, Germany

 Arthur Honegger – Sonata for viola and piano (1920); Michael Mann (viola); Dika Newlin (piano); recorded 19 March 1952
 Ernst Krenek – Sonata for viola and piano (1948); Michael Mann (viola); Yaltah Menuhin (piano); recorded 9 April 1951
Darius Milhaud - Quatre Visages (1943); Michael Mann (viola); Dika Newlin (piano); recorded 21 May 1952

Reissue: Johanna Martzy/Michael Mann: Complete Deutsche Grammophon recordings. Deutsche Grammophon/eloquence 484 3299 (2021)

See also
Dohm–Mann family tree

References

External links
Michael Mann genealogy wiki

1919 births
1977 suicides
German emigrants to the United States
German people of Jewish descent
German violinists
German male violinists
Harvard University alumni
Literature educators
University of California, Berkeley faculty
Professors of German in the United States
Michael
20th-century violinists
20th-century classical musicians
20th-century German musicians
20th-century German male musicians
Drug-related suicides in California
1977 deaths
German expatriates in Switzerland
German expatriates in France
German literature academics